Famous Monsters is the fifth studio album by the American punk rock band Misfits, released on October 5, 1999. It is the second in the post-Danzig era of the band, and the last album to feature Doyle Wolfgang von Frankenstein, Michale Graves, and Dr. Chud, who would all quit the band in 2000.

Album information
The album's title is an allusion to the horror/sci-fi magazine Famous Monsters of Filmland, from whom the Misfits borrow their classic logo font. The UK release also exclusively includes the song "1,000,000 Years BC", which was later re-released on Cuts from the Crypt in 2001.

The song "Scream!" was turned into a music video directed by George A. Romero. In addition, the band appeared in Romero's film Bruiser. "Kong at the Gates" was the theme music for WCW alumnus Vampiro.

The song "Descending Angel" was re-recorded and released as a single in 2013, with Jerry Only on lead vocals.

The song "Helena" is based on the film Boxing Helena.

Reception 

CMJ (10/18/99, p. 36) - "treads familiar Misfits territory...this classic band shows why it's one of the most revered names in punk rock."

Track listing

Personnel 
 Michale Graves - vocals
 Doyle Wolfgang Von Frankenstein - guitars
 Jerry Only - bass
 Dr. Chud - drums

Chart positions

References 

1999 albums
Misfits (band) albums
Roadrunner Records albums
Albums produced by Daniel Rey
albums produced by Ed Stasium